Astrochapsa sipmanii is a little-known species of corticolous (bark-dwelling) lichen in the family Graphidaceae. It is found in Singapore.

Taxonomy
The lichen was formally described as a new species in 2015 by Gothamie Weerakoon and Robert Lücking. It is only known to occur at the type locality. The species epithet sipmanii honours Dutch lichenologist Harrie Sipman, "for his contributions to our knowledge of Singapore lichens".

Description
The apothecia are more or less rounded to irregular, measuring 0.4–0.7 mm in diameter. The exposed disc is grey, and covered with a thick granular pruina. Ascospores number eight per ascus; they have between 3 and 5 septa and measure 12–15 by 3–4 μm. Analysis of the lichen using chemical analyses (thin-layer chromatography and high-performance thin-layer chromatography) did not reveal the presence of any lichen products. Astrochapsa astroidea, the type species of genus Astrochapsa, is somewhat similar in appearance to A. sipmanii, but that species has neither an olive-brown thallus nor the thick apothecial pruina.

References

Graphidaceae
Lichen species
Lichens described in 2015
Lichens of Malesia
Taxa named by Gothamie Weerakoon
Taxa named by Robert Lücking